Theodore Gaillard Croft (November 26, 1874 – March 23, 1920) was a U.S. Representative from South Carolina, son of George William Croft.

Born in Aiken, South Carolina, Croft attended the common schools.  He graduated from Bethel Military Academy in Warrenton, Virginia in 1895 and from the law department of the University of South Carolina at Columbia in 1897.  He was admitted to the bar the same year and commenced practice in Aiken, South Carolina.

Croft was elected as a Democrat to the Fifty-eighth Congress to fill the vacancy caused by the death of his father, George W. Croft, and served from May 17, 1904, to March 3, 1905. While in Congress, he carried on his father's idea of building a post office in downtown Aiken. He was not a candidate for renomination in 1904.  He resumed the practice of law in Aiken, South Carolina.  He later served as member of the State House of Representatives from 1907 to 1908.  He served in the State Senate from 1909 to 1912.

After the outbreak of World War I, he enlisted in the U.S. Army October 29, 1918.  He was assigned to duty as a private in the Field Artillery Central Officers' Training School, Camp Zachary Taylor, and served until December 5, 1918, when he was honorably discharged.

Afterward, he resumed the practice of law.  He died in Aiken, South Carolina, March 23, 1920 and was interred in St. Thaddeus' Episcopal Churchyard.

References

Sources

1874 births
1920 deaths
United States Army soldiers
Democratic Party members of the South Carolina House of Representatives
Democratic Party South Carolina state senators
Democratic Party members of the United States House of Representatives from South Carolina
University of South Carolina alumni
People from Aiken, South Carolina